Spencer Creek is a stream in Camden County in the U.S. state of Missouri. It is a tributary of Lake of the Ozarks.

Spencer Creek bears the name of a local pioneer.

See also
List of rivers of Missouri

References

Rivers of Camden County, Missouri
Rivers of Missouri